The 126th Pennsylvania House of Representatives District is located in Berks County and includes the following areas:

 Laureldale
 Lower Alsace Township
 Mount Penn
 Muhlenberg Township
 Reading (PART)
 Ward 06 [PART, Division 03]
 Ward 14 [PART, Division 06]
 Ward 15 [PART, Divisions 02, 06 and 07]
 Ward 17 [PART, Divisions 05, 07 and 08]
 Ward 18 [PART, Divisions 01 and 04]
 Ward 19
 St. Lawrence
 West Reading

Representatives

References

Government of Berks County, Pennsylvania
126